Dark October is a 2023 Nigerian film released to Netflix on 3 February 2023. The film is centered on the lynching of four young students at University of Port Harcourt, popularly known as the Aluu Four lynching. The four were falsely accused of theft in Aluu area of Port Harcourt. The film documents the events that led to their killings and the aftermath of the event.

Synopsis 
Based on true events, Dark October tells the story of four university students in Nigeria, who went to a particular area in search of a debtor who owed one of them. Unfortunately, the debtor raised a false alarm and alleged that the boys came to rob him of his valuables; mobs then paraded the boys as thieves and lynched them. The mob attack, however, sparked a nationwide crisis.

Selected cast 

 Chuks Joseph
 Munachi Okpara
 Oriaku Kelechukwu James 
 Kem-Ajieh Ikechukwu
 Adike Daniel
 CO2 Official

Production and release 
The film is distributed by Filmone Productions and directed by Toka McBaror. Following its release to Netflix on 3 February 2023, the executive producer, Linda Ikeji had said that she hopes that the film will spark a conversation about the dangers of extrajudicial killings and the importance of ensuring justice for all.

Controversy 
The parents of the boys who were lynched in the Aluu Four lynching expressed disapproval to the movie and have asked Netflix and Linda Ikeji to suspend the movie explaining that Linda Ikeji did not seek approval from them before proceeding to make movies about their sons.

References 

2023 films
English-language Netflix original films
English-language Nigerian films
2020s English-language films